Mahudi Jain Temple is situated in Mahudi town in Mansa taluka of Gandhinagar district, Gujarat. It is a pilgrimage centre of Jains and other communities visiting the temple of Jain deity, Ghantakarna Mahavir and the Padmaprabhu Jain Temple. It was known as Madhupuri historically.

History
Mahudi Jain Temple was established by Jain monk, Buddhisagarsuri in 1917 CE (Magshar Sudi 6, Vikram Samvat 1974). There is an inscription in the Brahmi script of it. In 1916 CE, the foundation stone was laid on land donated by Vadilal Kalidas Vora. He along with Punamchand Lallubhai Shah, Kankkuchand Narsidas Mehta and Himmatlal Hakamchand Mehta became trustees of a trust established to manage the temple. The central deity of this temple is a 22-inch marble idol of Padmaprabh. There is a separate shrine dedicated to Ghantakarna Mahavir, the protector deity.  The Guru Mandir, a shrine dedicated to Buddhisagarsuri was established later.

Culture
Devotees offer sukhadi, a sweet to Ghantakarna Mahavir. After offering, it is consumed by devotees within the temple complex. Tradition forbids the carrying away of such offerings outside premises.

Every year, on Kali Chaudas (the fourteenth day of the dark half of the month of Aso), thousands of devotees visit the temple to attend a religious ceremony, Havan.

Gallery

See also

 Padampura
 Vijapur

References

Jain temples in Gujarat
Gandhinagar district
20th-century Jain temples
Māru-Gurjara architecture
Tourist attractions in Gujarat